is a dam in southwestern Matsuzaka, Mie Prefecture, Japan, completed in 1991.

65 houses submerged.

References 

Dams in Mie Prefecture
Dams completed in 1991
1991 establishments in Japan